Gafieira Universal is the second album by Brazilian funk band Banda Black Rio released in 1978 vinyl format by RCA Records (103.0268) and reissued in 1993. Released in 2001 CD format by RCA Records and distributed by BMG Music under catalog number 74321865882.

Track listing

Personnel
Oberdan Pinto Magalhães – tenor saxophone, flute
Lucio J. da Silva – trombone
José Carlos Barroso (Barrosinho) – trumpet
Claudio Stevenson – guitar
Luiz Carlos "Batera" Santos – drums, percussion, vocals
Valdecir Nei Machado - bass, cuíca
Jorge Barreto (Jorjão) - electric piano, clavinet, organ, vocals
Roberto Tadeu de Sousa (Bebeto) - percussion
Carlinhos "Pandeiro de Ouro" de Oliveira - pandeiro, cuíca
Cristina Berio - xylophone

References

All information gathered from back cover CD release 2001 by RCA Records/BMG Music.

External links
Discogs

1978 albums
Banda Black Rio albums
RCA Records albums